Forster is a locality in the Murraylands region of South Australia. It lies on the inside of a bend on the east/left bank of the Murray River north of Walker Flat.

Forster previously had a Methodist Church in the locality. Reverend Clem Hawke (later father of Prime Minister Bob Hawke) was Methodist home missionary there in 1919. It also had a Lutheran Church. The original church building built in 1904 was burnt down in 1920 and replaced in 1921.

References

Towns in South Australia